Louis Lefèvre-Gineau (7 March 1751 – 3 February 1829), born at Authe (Ardennes), was a French chemist and scientist.

Of modest origins, a village elder approached d'Étrépigny to give this intelligent child the basics of knowledge that permitted him to shine in the studies of chemistry and of physics that he pursued at Reims then at Paris.

Beginning work with Lavoisier, he studied with him the chemical composition of water. A Deputy under the French revolution, he was a member of the commission charged to define the metric system and it is he who determined the mass of the kilogram.

From 1786 to 1823, he occupied the chair in mechanics, then general and experimental physics, at the Collège de France, where  he was the administrator from 1800 to 1823. He was made a member of the Académie des sciences in 1795. He was made a knight of Ainelle under Napoleon's Empire, in 1808.

in 1825, he built, in the guise of a retreat at Étrépigny a charming little neo-gothic chateau. He died in 1829, exactly 100 years after another illustrious citizen of the village: the curate Jean Meslier.

18th-century French chemists
Members of the French Academy of Sciences
1751 births
1829 deaths
19th-century French chemists